The 2016 Touring Car Masters was an Australian motor racing series for modified touring cars manufactured between 1 January 1963 and 31 December 1978. It was the tenth running of the Touring Car Masters. The series was sanctioned by the Confederation of Australian Motor Sport (CAMS) as an Authorised Series with Touring Car Masters Pty. Ltd. appointed as the Category Manager by CAMS.
	
The Pro Master class was won by John Bowe (Holden Torana), Pro Am by Jason Gomersall (Holden Torana), Pro Sport by Adam Garwood (Holden Torana) and the Invitational class by Greg Garwood (Ford Capri Perana).	
	
The Touring Cars Masters field was combined with New Zealand Central Muscle Car series competitors for the Bathurst round. The Trans-Tasman Challenge featured over 50 cars from both series with Glenn Seton winning the round in his Ford Mustang. Dean Perkins was the best placed New Zealander with his Ford Falcon.

Teams and drivers 
	
	
	
	
	
	
The following teams and drivers contested the series.

Race calendar 
The series was contested over eight rounds. Each round comprised a minimum of two Series Races and a Trophy Race.

Classes 
Each automobile was allocated into one of the following classes:	
	
 Pro-Master
 Pro-Am
 Pro-Sport
 Invitational

Points system
Series points were awarded in each Series Race per the following table:	

In addition, each driver was awarded 25 points for each Trophy Race in which they started and 25 points for each Trophy Race in which they finished.

Series standings

References

External links
 2016 Standings, www.touringcarmasters.com.au, as archived at web.archive.org

Touring Car Masters
Touring Car Masters